The following is a list of notable deaths in June 1994.

Entries for each day are listed alphabetically by surname. A typical entry lists information in the following sequence:
 Name, age, country of citizenship at birth, subsequent country of citizenship (if applicable), reason for notability, cause of death (if known), and reference.

June 1994

1
Jean-Joël Barbier, 74, French writer and pianist.
David Guthrie Catcheside, 87, British plant geneticist.
Herrlee Glessner Creel, 89, American sinologist and philosopher.
Henri Desroche, 79, French sociologist.
David Fairbairn, 77, Australian politician.
Frances Heflin, 73, American actress, lung cancer.
Frans Mosman, 89, Dutch fencer and Olympian.

2
Odd Dahl, 95, Norwegian engineer and explorer.
Ole Hegge, 95, Norwegian cross-country skier, ski jumper and Olympian.
Sandhya Kumari, 49, Sri Lankan actress.
David Stove, 66, Australian philosopher, suicide.

3
Puig Aubert, 69, French rugby player, and football player and coach, heart attack.
Duarte de Almeida Bello, 72, Portuguese sailor.
Stuart Blanch, 76, English Anglican priest, bishop and archbishop.
Jack Cowie, 82, New Zealand cricket player.
William Everson, 81, American poet and literary critic.
Wally Fowler, 77, American gospel music singer, manager, and music promoter.
Tribhuvandas Kishibhai Patel, 90, Indian politician.
Lucien Prival, 92, American film actor.
Jack Stroud, 66, American gridiron football player.
Pablo Muñoz Vega, 91, Ecuadorian Roman Catholic prelate and Jesuit.

4
Giovanni Azzini, 64, Italian football player.
Toto Bissainthe, 60, Haitian actress and singer, liver cancer.
Savaş Buldan, 30, Kurdish businessman, homicide.
Zeke Clements, 82, American country musician.
Jean Daetwyler, 87, Swiss composer and musician.
Derek Leckenby, 51, English musician and lead guitarist, cancer.
Roberto Burle Marx, 84, Brazilian landscape architect, painter, naturalist, and musician.
Stephen McNally, 82, American actor, heart attack.
Paul Miller, 79, American gridiron football player.
Gregory Scarpa, 66, American mobster and FBI informant, AIDS-related complications.
Peter Thorneycroft, Baron Thorneycroft, 84, British politician.
Massimo Troisi, 41, Italian actor, cabaret performer, screenwriter, and film director, heart attack.
Anatoli Vasiliev, 77, Russian/Soviet realist painter.
Earle Warren, 79, American saxophonist.

5
Krishna Chaithanya, 75, Indian writer.
Albert McDonald Cole, 92, American politician.
Nikolay Dementyev, 78, Soviet/Russian football playerand a coach.
Buraro Detudamo, 63, Nauruan politician.

6
Yohai Ben-Nun, 69, Israeli Navy general.
Ramdew Chaitoe, 51, Surinamese artist and a harmonium player.
Johnny Downs, 80, American child actor, singer, and dancer, cancer.
Princess Faiza Fuad of Egypt, 70, Egyptian princess and a Muhammad Ali Dynasty member.
Peter Graves, English actor and nobleman, heart attack.
Miloud Hadefi, 45, Algerian football player and manager.
Bill Hoffman, 92, American gridiron football player.
Mark McManus, 59, Scottish actor, pneumonia.
Nicholas Spanos, 52, American professor of psychology, plane crash.
Barry Sullivan, 81, American movie actor.

7
Verlon Biggs, 51, American gridiron football player, leukemia.
Rudolph Cartier, 90, Austrian television director, filmmaker, screenwriter and producer.
Anatolii Dorodnitsyn, 83, Russian mathematician, physicist, and professor.
Willie Humphrey, 93, American jazz clarinetist.
Vincent Nsengiyumva, 58, Rwandan prelate of the Roman Catholic Church, homicide.
Dennis Potter, 59, English television dramatist, screenwriter and journalist, pancreatic cancer.

8
Eddie Ambrose, 100, American jockey in thoroughbred horse racing.
Antonietta Baistrocchi, 38, Italian basketball player.
William Marshall, 76, American singer, bandleader and a film actor and director.
Dorothy Shoemaker McDiarmid, 87, American politician, heart attack.

9
Dhirendra Brahmachari, 70, Indian spiritual leader and yoga instructor, plane crash.
István Kocsis, 44, Hungarian football player, cancer.
Lynn Harold Loomis, 79, American mathematician.
David Reynoso, 68, Mexican actor, cancer.
Jan Tinbergen, 91, Dutch economist and Nobel Prize laureate.

10
Vic Bradford, 79, American Major League Baseball player.
Jimmy Cameron, 70, Canadian cricket player.
Mary Maxwell Gates, 64, American businesswoman and civic activist, breast cancer.
Nils Holmer, 90, Swedish linguist.
Edward Kienholz, 66, American installation artist and assemblage sculptor.
Guillermo Pérez de Arce Plummer, 87, Chilean politician and entrepreneur.
Noël Vantyghem, 46, Belgian cyclist.

11
Herbert Anderson, 77, American actor, stroke.
Richard Bartlett, 71, American director and producer in film and TV.
Jerome W. Conn, 86, American endocrinologist.
Jack Hannah, 81, American animator and writer and director of animated shorts, cancer.
Manolita Piña, 111, Spanish-Uruguayan artist and wife of Joaquín Torres García.

12
Christopher Collins, 44, American actor (G.I. Joe, Transformers, Inhumanoids) and stand-up comedian, stroke.
Menachem Mendel Schneerson, 92, Russian-American Orthodox rabbi
Nicole Brown Simpson, 35, American murder victim and ex-wife of former American football player O. J. Simpson, stabbed.
Ronald Goldman, 25, American murder victim, stabbed alongside Nicole Brown Simpson.
William Elgin Swinton, 93, Scottish paleontologist.

13
Charles Alvin Beckwith, 65, American Special Forces officer.
June Dayton, 70, American television actress.
Enrique Fava, 74, Argentine actor.
Nadia Gray, 70, Romanian film actress, cerebrovascular disease.
Stasys Lozoraitis Jr., 69, Lithuanian diplomat and politician, kidney failure.
James B. Pollack, 55, American astrophysicist, cancer.
K. T. Stevens, 74, American actress, lung cancer.
Igor Youskevitch, 82, Russian-Ukrainian ballet dancer and choreographer.

14
Ismail Chirine, 74, Egyptian diplomat and army officer.
Lionel Grigson, 52, English jazz musician, writer and teacher.
Emil Göing, 82, German basketball player.
Denys Hay, 78, British historian.
Victor Jorgensen, 80, American photographer and photo journalist.
Thomas Joseph Lane, 95, American politician.
Henry Mancini, 70, American composer, conductor, pianist and flautist, pancreatic cancer.
Marcel Mouloudji, 71, French singer and actor.
Michel Vitold, 78, Russian-French stage and film actor.
Lucien Vlaemynck, 79, Belgian road bicycle racer.

15
Clara Colosimo, 72, Italian film actress.
William Goodsir-Cullen, 87, Indian field hockey player and Olympian.
Manos Hatzidakis, 68, Greek composer and theorist, pulmonary edema.
Rich Johnson, 47, American basketball player.
Jack Schwartzman, 61, American film producer (Never Say Never Again, Being There, I Am the Cheese), pancreatic cancer.

16
Yohanan Bader, 92, Israeli politician and revisionist Zionist leader.
Len Butt, 83, English football player and manager.
Chrix Dahl, 88, Norwegian painter and illustrator.
Comte George Raphaël Béthenod de Montbressieux, 84, French-Argentine racing driver.
Bernard Moitessier, 69, French sailor, prostate cancer.
Kristen Pfaff, 27, American musician and singer, drug overdose.
Eileen Way, 82, British actress.

17
Boris Alexandrovich Alexandrov, 88, Soviet/Russian composer.
Leonid Baykov, 74, Russian/Soviet painter.
Kurt Hessenberg, 85, German composer and professor of art.
Eigil Olaf Liane, 78, Norwegian politician.
Yuri Nagibin, 74, Soviet/Russian writer, screenwriter and novelist.
Branko Petranović, 66, Serbian historian.
Len White, 64, English football player.
Terence de Vere White, 82, Irish lawyer, writer and editor, Parkinson's disease.
Frank Yates, 92, British statistician.

18
Arturo Ruiz Castillo, 83, Spanish screenwriter and film director, stroke.
Yekusiel Yehudah Halberstam, 89, Polish-American Orthodox rabbi and holocaust survivor.
Margret Hofheinz-Döring, 84, German painter and graphic artist.
Roger Lebel, 71, Canadian actor.

19
Bob Dennison, 82, English football player.
Babatunde Elegbede, 55, Nigerian politician and admiral, homicide.
Krešimir Račić, 61, Croatian hammer thrower and Olympian.
Bakri Siregar, 71, Indonesian socialist literary critic and writer.

20
Robert Armbruster, 96, American composer, conductor, pianist and songwriter.
John Farrell, 87, American speed skater and speed skating coach.
Frank Filchock, 77, American gridiron football player and coach.
Einar Haugen, 88, American linguist, author, and professor.
Don Macintosh, 62, Canadian basketball player.
Jay Miner, 62, American integrated circuit designer, kidney failure.
Robin Raymond, 77, American film actress.
Frederick William Rowe, 81, Canadian politician.
Vieno Simonen, 95, Finnish politician and farmer.

21
Carlos Jiménez Mabarak, 78, Mexican composer.
Winston Miller, 83, American screenwriter, film producer, and actor, heart attack.
William Wilson Morgan, 88, American astronomer and astrophysicist.
Walter Riml, 88, Austrian cameraman and actor.

22
Otto Bradfisch, 91, German SS-Obersturmbannführer and war criminal during World War II.
Yitzhak Coren, 83, Israeli politician.
Jack Davies, 80, English screenwriter, producer, editor and actor.
Jorgjia Filçe-Truja, 87, Albanian soprano.
Ilya Frez, 84, Soviet/Russian film director.
Lisa Lindstrom, 81, American swimmer and Olympian.
L. V. Prasad, 86, Indian film producer, actor, director, and cinematographer.
Julius Adams Stratton, 93, American electrical engineer.
Xəlil Rza Ulutürk, 61, Azerbaijani poet.
Eric Bransby Williams, 94, British actor.

23
Joe Dobson, 77, American baseball player.
Robert T. Orr, 85, American biologist.
Chang Shuhong, 90, Chinese painter.
Antoni Sobik, 89, Polish fencer.
Marv Throneberry, 60, American Major League Baseball player, cancer.
Kin Vassy, 50, American singer-songwriter, lung cancer.

24
Bondoc Ionescu-Crum, 79, Romanian athlete and football player and manager.
Leon MacLaren, 83, British philosopher and the founder of the School of Economic Science.
Jean Vallerand, 78, Canadian musician and writer.
Vecheslav Zagonek, 74, Soviet/Russian painter.

25
James Philo Hagerstrom, 73, American fighter pilot and flying ace, stomach cancer.
Pierre Leichtnam, 83, French middle-distance runner and Olympian.
Haji Mastan, 68, Indian mafia gang leader, cardiac arrest.
Matvey Shaposhnikov, 87, Soviet military commander.

26
Thomas Armstrong, 96, English organist, conductor, composer and educationalist.
Bobby Bonales, 77, Mexican professional wrestler.
A. den Doolaard, 93, Dutch writer and journalist.
Joseph Aloysius Durick, 79, American Roman Catholic bishop and civil rights advocate.
Jahanara Imam, 65, Bangladeshi writer and political activist, cancer.

27
Jacques Berthier, 71, French composer of liturgical music.
Charles K. Duncan, 82, American Navy admiral, cancer.
Sam Hanks, 79, American racecar driver.
Louise Henderson, 92, New Zealand artist and painter.
Alan Strange, 87, American baseball player and manager.

28
Idel Ianchelevici, 85, Romanian-Belgian sculptor and draughtsman.
Ulrik Neumann, 75, Danish film actor and musician.
Giancarlo Sbragia, 68, Italian actor, stage director and playwright.
Fredi Washington, 90, American actress, civil rights activist,  and writer, stroke.

29
Peter Blair, 62, American naval officer, wrestler and Olympian.
Kurt Eichhorn, 85, German conductor.
Bob Masterson, 78, American gridiron football player.
Ray Mueller, 82, American baseball player.
Otis M. Smith, 72, American judge, Michigan Auditor General (1959–1961), Justice of the Michigan Supreme Court (1961–1966).
Jack Unterweger, 43, Austrian serial killer, suicide.

30
Georgie Abrams, 75, American boxer.
Walter Chikowski, 78, Canadian football player.
Jim Doran, 66, American gridiron football player.
Don Kolloway, 75, American Major League Baseball player.
Dennis J. Roberts, 91, American politician 
Taro Yashima, 85, Japanese-American artist and children's author.

References 

1994-06
 06